Jarett is a given name. Notable people with the name include:

Jarett Cale, plays Jeremy in Pure Pwnage, an Internet-distributed, mockumentary series
Jarett Dillard (born 1985), American football wide receiver for the Jacksonville Jaguars
Jarett Park (born 1982), professional lacrosse player from Otisco, New York
Jarett Levine (born 2005), a professional basketball player from Centerport, New York
Jarett Andretti (born 1992), an American racing driver from Charlotte, North Carolina.

See also
Charette (disambiguation)
Charrette
Garett
Garrett (disambiguation)
Jarrett (disambiguation)